Dr. Álvaro Guião State School is a secondary school in São Carlos, São Paulo, Brazil. It was founded in 1911.

External links

Schools in São Paulo